The seventy-second Minnesota Legislature first convened on January 6, 1981. The 67 members of the Minnesota Senate and the 134 members of the Minnesota House of Representatives were elected during the General Election of November 4, 1980.

Sessions 
The legislature met in a regular session from January 6, 1981 to May 18, 1981. Three special sessions were also convened in 1981. The first of these special sessions was convened on June 6 to consider the state budget, appropriations, and a tax bill. The second of the special sessions was convened on July 1 and July 2 to consider a short-term borrowing law and to correct errors in the laws enacted during the regular session. The third special session of 1981 was convened from December 1, 1981 to January 18, 1982, to consider reducing appropriations.

A continuation of the regular session was held between January 12, 1982 and March 19, 1982. Three additional special sessions were also held in 1982. The first of these special sessions was convened on March 30 to consider changes to the state's unemployment and workers' compensation laws. The second was convened on July 9 to consider authorizing Albert Lea to spend federal revenue sharing funds, and to consider providing employment aid to the Iron Range from the Northeast Minnesota Economic Protection Fund. The final special session of the 72nd Minnesota Legislature met from December 7, 1982 to December 10, 1982, and considered reductions in appropriations, reducing employer and increasing employee contributions to various retirement funds, adding two members to the investment advisory board, and so forth.

Party summary 
Resignations and new members are discussed in the "Membership changes" section, below.

Senate

House of Representatives

Leadership

Senate 
President of the Senate
John T. Davies (DFL-Minneapolis)

Senate Majority Leader
Roger Moe (DFL-Ada)

Senate Minority Leader
Robert O. Ashbach (IR-St. Paul)

House of Representatives 
Speaker of the House
Harry A. Sieben (DFL-Hastings)

House Majority Leader
Willis Eken (DFL-Twin Valley)

House Minority Leader
Until February 1982 Glen Sherwood (IR-Pine River)
From February 1982 David M. Jennings (IR-Truman)

Members

Senate

House of Representatives

Membership changes

Senate

House of Representatives

Notes

References 

 Minnesota Legislators Past & Present - Session Search Results (Session 72, Senate)
 Minnesota Legislators Past & Present - Session Search Results (Session 72, House)

72nd
1980s in Minnesota
1981 in Minnesota
1982 in Minnesota
1981 U.S. legislative sessions
1982 U.S. legislative sessions